Nassenheide station is a railway station in the Nassenheide district in the municipality of Löwenberger Land, located in the Oberhavel district in Brandenburg, Germany.

References

Railway stations in Brandenburg
Buildings and structures in Oberhavel
Railway stations in Germany opened in 1879
1879 establishments in Prussia